Henry Walter House is a historic home located at West Cocalico Township, Lancaster County, Pennsylvania. It was built between about 1750 and 1768, and is a two-story, rectangular banked sandstone dwelling in a Germanic style. It has a gable roof and features precise cut stone masonry, with a polychromatic effect from differing shades of brown and red sandstone. Also on the property is a contributing stone and frame bank barn, with portions that may pre-date 1815.

It was listed on the National Register of Historic Places in 1984.

References

Houses on the National Register of Historic Places in Pennsylvania
Houses completed in 1768
Houses in Lancaster County, Pennsylvania
National Register of Historic Places in Lancaster County, Pennsylvania
1768 establishments in Pennsylvania